1967–68 Albanian Cup was the seventeenth season of Albania's annual cup competition. It began in August 1967 with the First Round and ended in May 1968 with the Final match. Partizani were the defending champions, having won their seventh Albanian Cup last season. The cup was won by Partizani.

The rounds were played in a one-legged format similar to those of European competitions. If the number of goals was equal, the match was decided by extra time and a penalty shootout, if necessary.

First round
Games were played on August, 1967*

 Results unknown

Second round
In this round entered the 16 winners from the previous round. First and second legs were played in January 1968.

|}

Quarter-finals
In this round entered the 8 winners from the previous round.

|}

Semi-finals
In this round entered the four winners from the previous round.

|}

Final

References

 Calcio Mondiale Web

External links
 Official website 

Albanian Cup seasons
Cup
Albania